Nedytisis is a genus of longhorn beetles of the subfamily Lamiinae, containing the following species:

 Nedytisis fuscoapicalis Breuning, 1950
 Nedytisis obrioides Pascoe, 1866

References

Saperdini